Parliamentary elections were held in Bulgaria on 25 February 1962. Voters were presented with a single list from the Fatherland Front, dominated by the Bulgarian Communist Party. As the Fatherland Front was the only organisation to contest the election and all candidate lists had to be approved by the Front, voters only had the option of voting for or against the Front list. Only 1,668 of the 5,462,892 valid votes were cast against the Front list. Voter turnout was reportedly 99.7%.

Results

References

Bulgaria
1962 in Bulgaria
Parliamentary elections in Bulgaria
One-party elections
1962 elections in Bulgaria
February 1962 events in Europe